Erwin Bittmann (30 January 1928 – 5 August 2019) was an Austrian rower. He competed in the men's coxed four event at the 1948 Summer Olympics.

References

1928 births
2019 deaths
Austrian male rowers
Olympic rowers of Austria
Rowers at the 1948 Summer Olympics